Arca South is a 74-hectare planned unit development owned by Ayala Land, Inc. located at East Service Road, Barangay Western Bicutan, Taguig.

It was formerly part of Food Terminal Inc. before being sold to Ayala Land.

History 
With the decline of FTI, there have been several attempts over multiple Philippines presidential administrations to sell off part of the property, including a public auction in 2009, but they all failed.

In November 2012, the Philippine government announced the sale of the 74 hectares of the 120-hectare property to Ayala Land, Inc. for 24.3 billion Philippine pesos. Ayala plans to turn the property into a mixed-use development. Proceeds from the sale are pledged to the programs of the Department of Agriculture and the Department of Agrarian Reform. The remaining 46 hectares remains in FTI.

In 2013, Ayala Land renamed their property into Arca South. Current construction of the mall is estimated to be completed by 2023, 6 years after its initial target date.

Current developments

Residential 

 Arbor Lanes
 Gardencourt Residences 
 The Veranda
 Park Cascades 
 Avida Towers One Union Place
 Avida Towers Vireo

Commercial/Institutional 

 Arca South Corporate Center
 Ayala Malls Arca South (Transit, Regional, & Lifestyle Malls)
 Sunshine Mall
 Arca Main Street
 Tryne Enterprise Plaza
 Makati Development Corporation (MDC) Headquarters
 Savya Financial Center
 Bamberton Place
 Z2 Tower
 Manta Corporate Plaza
 QualiMed Hospital
 Seda Hotel
 AANI Outdoor Market
 Landers Superstore

Transportation

Land 
The planned North–South Commuter Railway and Metro Manila Subway Line 9's FTI station will be connected to the Taguig Integrated Terminal Exchange (TITX), which is located in Arca South.

References

External links 

 Official website

Mixed-use developments in Metro Manila
Buildings and structures in Taguig
Planned communities in the Philippines